The 2003 FIVB Women's U20 World Championship was held in Suphanburi, Thailand from September 6 to 14, 2003. 16 teams participated in the tournament.

Qualification process

 Turkey qualified as the best second place of the 2003 Women's Junior European Volleyball Championship Qualification's groups.

Pools composition

Preliminary round

Pool A

|}

|}

Pool B

|}

|}

Pool C

|}

|}

Pool D

|}

|}

Second round

Play off – elimination group

|}

Play off – seeding group

|}

Final round

Quarterfinals

|}

5th–8th semifinals

|}

Semifinals

|}

7th place

|}

5th place

|}

3rd place

|}

Final

|}

Final standing

Individual awards

Best Scorer:  Manon Flier
Best Spiker:  Fabiana Claudino
Best Blocker:  Christiane Furst
Best Server:  Manon Flier
Best Setter:  Guan Jingjing
Best Receiver:  Agata Sawicka
Best Digger:  Agata Sawicka

External links
 Official website.

World Championship
Women's U20 Volleyball World Championship
Volleyball
FIVB Volleyball Women's U20 World Championship
FIVB Women's Junior World Championship
2003 in youth sport